Yesmala is a town in western Ethiopia. It was the administrative center of Achefer woreda.

A notable point of interest in Yesmala is the church of Yeldet Giyorgis ("The Daughter of George"). The town is located in the midway between Bahir Dar and Kunzila next to Dilamo (small town of Debub Achefer woreda). The big Tana-Beles hydro electric power plant is located in this route near Kunzila. Debub and semen Acehfer woreda were one woreda (Achefer Woreda) before they split into two. Achefer is historical district which was first mentioned in the 16th century.

History 
One of the earliest mentions of Yesmala is in the Royal chronicle of Emperor Iyasu the Great, where the Emperor stopped twice during his travels in Gojjam in 1702 and the following year. Hormuzd Rassam records that he stopped briefly here 21 January 1866, describing it as the largest village he had seen since his entry into Ethiopia. He was told that Yesmala had been "reckoned one of the most important in the Amhara country, owing to its wealth and to the number of militia which it furnished to the Emperors in time of war."

During the Italian occupation, an Italian official was stationed in Yesmala. The town had a telegraph station and an infirmary.

Yesmala is the home town of the known Ethiopian author and journalist, Abe Gubegna or Abbey Gubegna, (Amharic: አበ ጉበኛ)who  was  born in 1944 and died in 1980.
One of Gubegna's works is "Aliwoledim," which roughly translates as "I Rufuse To Be Born," or "I Will Not Be Born." Gubegna also wrote "And LeNatu."
Gubegna and his works were banished from Ethiopia.
He is credited with penning the proverb, "Every day in Africa a gazelle wakes up. It knows it must run faster than the fastest lion or it will be killed. Every morning a lion wakes up. It knows that it must outrun the slowest gazelle or it will starve to death. It doesn’t matter whether you are a lion or a gazelle. When the sun comes up, you better be running."

Demographics 
Based on figures from the Central Statistical Agency in 2005, this town has an estimated total population of 5,309 of whom 2,497 are men and 2,812 women. The 1994 census reported this town had a total population of 3,027 of whom 1,266 were men and 1,761 were women.

The town has one elementary (called Abe Gubegna elementary school), one junior and one preparatory schools. It is a place where many scientists and wealthy people were/are born but the most neglected. The infrastructure (the road, the telecommunication, clean water supply and other infrastructures) are inadequate and poor. The town has no hospital. This town needs attention. Its calling the Ethiopian government and its people for help.

References 

Populated places in the Amhara Region